Daniel Múgica (born 4 April 1967, San Sebastián) is a writer and film director, son of the Spanish Jewish politician Enrique Múgica Herzog and the novelist Faustina Díaz Azcona.

Published works 
 En los hilos del títere. Realism. Novel. Publisher Plaza & Janes. 1988.  
 Uno se vuelve loco. Dirty realism. Novel. Publisher Planeta. Planeta Group. 1899.
 Mar Calamidad. Stories. Publisher Mondadori. 1990. 
 La mujer que faltaba. Dirty realism. Novel. Publisher Plaza & Janes. 1993. 
 La Bici Cleta. Children´s story. Publisher Anaya. 1994.
 Alba y los cazadores de arañas. Young fiction. Novel. Publisher Anaya. 1995.
 Alba y la maldición gamada. Young fiction. Novel. Publisher Anaya. 1995. 
 Alba y el recaudador de aguas. Young fiction. Novel. Publisher Anaya in 1995. 
 Alba y el laberinto de las sombras. Young fiction. Novel. Publisher Anaya. 1995.
 La ciudad de abajo. Dirty realism. Novel. Publisher Plaza & Janes. 1996.
 El poder de la sombra. Young fiction. Novel. Publisher Alfaguay. Alfaguara Group. 1998.
 Corazón negro. Epistolary novel. Publisher Plaza & Janes. 1998. 
 Mala Saña. Dystopian novel. Publisher Plaza & Janes. 2000.
 África en invierno. Dirty realism. Novel. Publisher Notodo. 2000. 
 Bienvenido a la tormenta. Urban fantasy. Publisher Minotauro. Planeta Group. 2014.
 La dulzura. Intimate novel. Publisher Alzmuzara. Almuzara Group. 2107.
 Mr. Smile. La aventura. Young fiction. Publisher Toromítico. Almuzara group. 2019.

Theater 
Author of La habitación escondida [The Hidden Room]. Autumn Festival. 1993.

Television 
Screenwriter. La virtud del asesino. TVE Series. 1997.

Filmography  
Direction and Screenplay:

 Pepo. Medium length film. 35 mm. 1991.
 Vientos de mal. A story of Basque terrorism. Medium length film. 35 mm. 1999. YouTube.
 Año cero. TV Movie. TVE. 35 mm.
 Ausiàs March. Series of two chapters. Valencian TV. 35 mm. 2001. 
 Matar al Ángel. Movie. 35 mm. 2003.

Awards 

 Novel: Ateneo de Sevilla prize for Uno se vuelve loco
Film: Vientos de mal (A story of Basque terrorism). YouTube. Menorca International Festival  1999. First jury prize.
 Novel: Premio Jaén of novel prize for "La dulzura". 2017.

References

External links 
 

Living people
1967 births
Spanish male writers